Carantec is a commune in the Finistère department of Brittany in north-western France.

Carantec is located on the coast of the English Channel. It contains a small island within its boundaries, Île Callot, which can be reached by a causeway during most low tides (except at neap tide). Carantec is bordered by the communes of Henvic and Taulé to the south, and is near to the town of Morlaix.

International relations
Carantec is twinned with

Local Industries
Carantec's two primary industries are oyster farming and tourism.

Tourism
Since 1926, Carantec has been classified as a "station balnéaire".

Oyster Farming
Carantec and the Bay of Morlaix have been home to oyster farming operations since 1892.  Today Carantec is home to 15 oyster farms with over 700 hectares of oyster beds that produce over 6500 tonnes of oysters per year.

Population
Inhabitants of Carantec are called in French Carantécois.

Sights
 The Château du Taureau (17th century), castle built on a reef to protect the town of Morlaix from English incursions by sea. It is located on the territory of the commune of Plouezoc'h, but is closer to Carantec, a port at from which it can easily be visited.
 The Rohou Mansion, built at the end of the 19th century.
 Île Louët, an islet with its lighthouse, built in 1857 to plans by the engineer Fenoux, and its caretaker's house is now rented as a tourist lodge.
 Callot Island, accessible by a causeway that the tide covers and uncovers.
 The Saint-Carantec church, in neo-Gothic style, dates from the 19th century and was built by the architect of the time, Mr. de Kermenguy. The apse contains a beautiful processional cross (1652) in silver and another simpler one in front of the altar.
 The Lande lighthouse.
 The maritime museum of Carantec began with the exhibition of objects recovered from the wrecked boat L'Alcide, a privateer from Saint-Malo which sank in 1747 in the bay of Morlaix. The museum deals with various themes of the region: oyster farming, privateering (the Alcide corsair, a cannon of which is in the Jacobins museum in Morlaix), the flora and fauna of Morlaix, a collection of seaweed.
 The old slate quarry of Roc'h Glas (toponym meaning "blue rock") is open on the edge of Morlaix's harbor. Slate extraction, attested from the middle of the 19th century, took place both on the foreshore and a little further back, in the coastal cliff.

See also
Communes of the Finistère department

References

External links
Official website 
360° Photosphere by John Goulding, Visual360Media.com

Communes of Finistère